Kuzmice is a village and municipality in the Trebišov District in the Košice Region of eastern Slovakia.

History 
The village was first mentioned in year 1270, when it was called "Kosma". The village was renamed to "Kozmay" in 1327, in year 1427 to "Kozmafalwa", but in year 1773, village was renamed to Kuzmice. Village was than called "Kuznice" from year 1920 to year 1927, when it was renamed back to Kuzmice.

External links
https://web.archive.org/web/20070513023228/http://www.statistics.sk/mosmis/eng/run.html

Villages and municipalities in Trebišov District